Bowditch Crests is a line of precipitous cliffs surmounted by four summits on Bermel Peninsula in eastern Graham Land. The feature was photographed from the air by Lincoln Ellsworth in November 1935 and was mapped from these photos by W.L.G. Joerg. It was surveyed by the Falkland Islands Dependencies Survey in 1958, and named by the UK Antarctic Place-Names Committee for Nathaniel Bowditch, American astronomer and mathematician, author of The New American Practical Navigator (1801) which firmly set out the practical results of theories established at that date and has since gone through more than 56 editions.

References
 

Cliffs of Graham Land
Bowman Coast